Latin is a heavily inflected language with largely free word order. Nouns are inflected for number and case; pronouns and adjectives (including participles) are inflected for number, case, and gender; and verbs are inflected for person, number, tense, aspect, voice, and mood. The inflections are often changes in the ending of a word, but can be more complicated, especially with verbs.

Thus verbs can take any of over 100 different endings to express different meanings, for example  "I rule",  "I am ruled",  "to rule",  "to be ruled". Most verbal forms consist of a single word, but some tenses are formed from part of the verb  "I am" added to a participle; for example,  "I was led" or  "he is going to lead".

Nouns belong to one of three genders (masculine, feminine, and neuter). The gender of a noun is shown by the adjectives and pronouns that refer to it: e.g.,  "this man",  "this woman",  "this name". There are also two numbers: singular ( "woman") and plural ( "women").

As well as having gender and number, nouns, adjectives, and pronouns have different endings according to their function in the sentence, for example,  "the king" (subject), but  "the king" (object). These different endings are called "cases". Most nouns have six cases: nominative (subject), accusative (object), 
genitive ("of"), dative ("to" or "for"), ablative ("with" or "in"), and vocative (used for addressing). Some nouns have a seventh case, the locative; this is mostly found with the names of towns and cities, e.g.  "in Rome".

There is no definite or indefinite article in Latin, so that  can mean "king", "a king", or "the king" according to context.

Latin word order tends to be subject–object–verb; however, other word orders are common. Different word orders are used to express different shades of emphasis. (See Latin word order.)

An adjective can come either before or after a noun, e.g.  or  "a good man", although some kinds of adjectives, such as adjectives of nationality ( "a Roman man") usually follow the noun.

Latin usually omits pronouns as the subject except for emphasis; so for example  by itself means "you love" without the need to add the pronoun  "you". (A language with this characteristic is known as a pro-drop language.) Latin also exhibits verb framing in which the path of motion is encoded into the verb rather than shown by a separate word or phrase.

In this article a line over a vowel (e.g. ē) indicates that it is long.

Nouns

Number
Most Latin nouns have two numbers, singular and plural:  "king",  "kings". A few nouns, called  ("plural only"), although plural in form, have a singular meaning, e.g.  "a camp",  "a letter",  "a wedding".

Gender
Nouns are divided into three genders, known as masculine, feminine, and neuter. The difference is shown in the pronouns and adjectives that refer to them, for example:
 "the king himself" (masculine)
 "the queen herself" (feminine)
 "the war itself" (neuter)

To a certain extent, the genders follow the meanings of the words (for example, winds are masculine, tree-names feminine):

Masculine nouns include all those referring to males, such as  "master",  "boy",  "god", but also some inanimate objects such as  "garden",  "army",  "custom". Words in the 2nd declension ending in -us or -er are usually masculine.
Feminine nouns include all those referring to females, such as  "girl",  "woman",  "goddess", but also inanimate or abstract nouns such as  "tree",  "city",  "kindness",  "nation". Words in the 1st declension like  ending in -a are usually feminine, with a few exceptions such as  "poet.” Also feminine are 3rd declension nouns ending in -tās and -tiō.
Neuter nouns (apart from  "a sex worker (of either gender)") all refer to things, such as  "name",  "body",  "war",  'poison'.

Neuter nouns differ from masculine and feminine in two ways: (1) the plural ends in -a, e.g.  "wars",  "bodies"; (2) the subject (nominative) and object (accusative) cases are identical.

Case
Nouns in Latin have a series of different forms, called cases of the noun, which have different functions or meanings. For example, the word for "king" is  when it is the subject of a verb, but  when it is the object:
 "the king sees" (nominative case)
 "(he) sees the king" (accusative case)

Further cases mean "of" (genitive case), "to/for" (dative case), and "with" (ablative case). A few nouns have a separate form used for addressing a person (vocative case), but in most nouns the vocative is the same as the nominative.

Some nouns, such as the names of cities and small islands, and the word  "home", have a seventh case called the locative, for example  "in Rome" or  "at home". But most nouns do not have this case.

All the cases except nominative and vocative are called the "oblique" cases.

The order in which the cases are given in grammar books differs in different countries. In Britain and countries influenced by Britain, the order nominative, vocative, accusative is used as in the table below. In the United States, in grammars such as Gildersleeve and Lodge, (1895) the traditional order is used, with the genitive case in the second place and ablative last. In the popularly used Wheelock's Latin (1956, 7th edition 2011) and Allen and Greenough's New Latin Grammar (1903), however, the vocative is placed at the end.

The following table shows the endings of a typical noun of the 3rd declension. If Gildersleeve and Lodge's order is preferred, click on the symbol "GL" in the seventh column in the table below; for Wheelock's order click on "Wh":

Since the function of a word in Latin is shown by ending rather than word order, in theory  could mean either "the kings lead" or "they lead the kings". In practice, however, such ambiguities are rare.

Declensions

1st and 2nd declensions
Latin nouns are divided into different groups according to the patterns of their case endings. These different groups are known as declensions. Nouns with -a in the nominative singular, like  "girl" are known as 1st declension nouns, and so on.

The following table shows the declension of  "girl" (1st declension),  "lord, master" (2nd declension masculine), and  "war" (2nd declension neuter):

1st declension nouns are usually feminine, except for a few referring to men, such as  "farmer" or  "poet". The nouns  "daughter" and  "goddess" have dative and ablative plural . The locative case ends in -ae, pl. -īs, e.g.  "in Rome",  "in Athens".

2nd declension nouns in -us are usually masculine, but those referring to trees (e.g.  "pine tree") and some place names (e.g.  "Egypt") are feminine. A few 2nd declension nouns, such as  "man" and  "boy", lack endings in the nominative and vocative singular. In the 2nd declension, the genitive plural in some words is optionally -um, especially in poetry:  or  "of the gods",  or  "of men".

Neuter nouns such as  "war" have -a in the nominative plural. In neuter nouns, the vocative and accusative are always the same as the nominative; the genitive, dative, and ablative are the same as the masculine. Most 2nd declension neuter nouns end in -um but  "poison" and  "crowd" end in -us.

3rd declension
Third declension nouns have various patterns of declension. Some decline like the following:  "soldier",  "city",  "body":

There are some variations, however. A few, such as  "force", have accusative singular -im and ablative singular -ī; some, like  "fire", optionally have -ī instead of -e in the ablative singular. The genitive plural in some nouns is -um, in others -ium. (For details, see Latin declension.) 3rd declension nouns can be of any gender.

It is not usually possible to guess the genitive of a noun from the nominative.  "leader" has genitive  but  "king" has ;  "father" has genitive  but  "journey" has . For this reason the genitive is always given in dictionaries, and can be used to discover the remaining cases.

4th and 5th declension
4th and 5th declension nouns are less common. They decline like the following ( "hand",  "knee",  "day"):
 

4th declension nouns are usually masculine, but a few, such as  "hand" and  "old lady", are feminine. There are only four 4th declension neuter nouns.

"thing" is similar to  except for a short e in the genitive and dative singular .

Other nouns
In addition to the above there are some irregularly declined nouns, mostly borrowed from Greek, such as the name  "Aeneas" (1st declension masculine).

The vocative is nearly always the same as the nominative, except in 1st and 2nd declension masculine singular words, such as  "Aeneas!" and  "master!/lord!". Some words, such as  "god", have no separate vocative, however.

Use of cases

Nominative
The nominative case is used for the subject of an active or a passive verb:
 = the king replied
 = the king was killed

It is also used for the complement of a copula verb such as  "he is" or  "he became":
 = our king was Aeneas / Aeneas was our king
 = he was made king / he became king

Vocative
The vocative case is used when addressing someone:
 = do you order me, King Romulus, to strike a treaty?

Accusative
The accusative case is used for the object of a sentence:
 = they killed the king

It is also used as the subject of an infinitival clause dependent on a verb of speaking or the like:
 = they believed that the king had been killed

It can be the complement of another word which is itself accusative:
 = the people made Tullus their king

It can also be used with a place name to refer to the destination:
 = he set out for Rome

The accusative is also used after various prepositions (especially those that imply motion towards):
 = the Senate sent ambassadors to the king
 = the consul returned to the city

Another use of the accusative is to give a length of time or distance:
 = he reigned for five years
 = five foot tall

Genitive
A genitive noun can represent a kin:
 = the king's daughter, daughter of the king
 = my daughter, daughter of mine

A genitive noun can stand for the phenomenon of mental processes such as  "I pity" and  "I forget", or the senser of mental processes such as  "it interests": 
 = I will never forget that night

A genitive noun can stand for either the senser or phenomenon of a mental process represented by a noun:
 = I long for you
 = my longing for you

 = the warriors long for a reign
 = the warriors' longing for a reign

A genitive noun can stand for the actor of a process represented by a noun:
 = Caesar arrived
 = Caesar's arrival

A frequent type of genitive is the partitive genitive, expressing the quantity of something:
 = enough time

Dative
The dative case means "to" or "for". It is frequently used with verbs of saying or giving: 
 = it was announced to the king
 = he entrusted the money to the king

It can also be used with certain adjectives:
 = he was very dear to the king

It is also used with certain verbs such as  "I obey" or  "I persuade":
 = he was obedient to (i.e. obeyed) the king

There are also various idiomatic uses, such as the dative of possession:
 = what's your name?

Ablative
The ablative case can mean "with", especially when the noun it refers to is a thing rather than a person:
 = he stabbed himself with a sword

Often a phrase consisting of a noun plus participle in the ablative can express time or circumstance. This is known as an "ablative absolute":
 = with the kings driven out, i.e. after the kings were driven out

It is also frequently used with prepositions, especially those meaning "from", "with", "in", or "by":
 = one from (i.e. one of) the kings
 = with the kings
 = by the kings, from the kings
 = for/on behalf of the king

Another use is in expressions of time and place (except those that give the length of time or distance):
 = at that time
 = at this place
 = in a few days

The ablative can also mean "from", especially with place names:
 = he set out from Rome
 = he was dislodged from his position

Locative
The locative is a rare case used only with names of cities, small islands, and one or two other words such as domus "home". It means "at" or "in":
 = one of the two consuls remained in Rome
 = he lived at our house for many years

Adjectives

Declension of adjectives
Adjectives, like nouns, have different endings for the different cases, singular and plural. They also differ as to gender, having different forms for masculine, feminine, and neuter. (But masculine and neuter are identical in the genitive, dative, and ablative cases.)

Many adjectives belong to the 1st and 2nd declensions, declining in the same way as the nouns . An example is the adjective  "good" shown below:

Other adjectives belong to the 3rd declension, in which case the masculine and feminine are usually identical. Most 3rd declension adjectives are i-stems, and have ablative singular -ī and genitive plural -ium. An example is  "huge" shown below:

In a very few 3rd declension adjectives such as  "sharp, keen", the feminine is different from the masculine, but only in the nominative and vocative singular.

A few adjectives (especially comparative adjectives) decline as consonant stems, and have ablative singular -e and genitive plural -um. An example is  "better":

Participles such as  "leading" usually have -e in the ablative singular, but -ium in the genitive plural.

There are no adjectives in the 4th or 5th declensions.

The adjectives  "only" and  "the whole of" decline like pronouns, with genitive singular -īus and dative singular -ī:
 = of the whole of Greece (genitive case)
 = to you alone (dative case)

Agreement of adjectives
Any adjective that describes or refers to a noun must be in the same case as the noun, as well as the same number and gender. Thus in the phrase below, where rēx is in the vocative singular case, bonus must be in the vocative singular also:
 = o good king

Comparative and superlative adjectives
Adjectives have positive, comparative and superlative forms. Superlative adjectives are declined according to the first and second declension, but comparative adjectives are third declension.

When used in sentences, a comparative adjective can be used in several ways:
 Absolutely (with the meaning "rather" or "more than usual")
 With  (Latin for "than")
 With an ablative meaning "than"
 With the genitive

Examples:

 : Cornelia is a brave girl.

The comparative adjective can be used absolutely (i.e. without any overt comparison) or with the comparison made explicit:
 : Cornelia is a rather brave girl.
 : Cornelia is a braver girl than Flavia. (Here quam is used, Flavia is in the nominative to match Cornelia)
 : Cornelia is braver than Flavia. (Here Flavia is in the ablative.)
 : Cornelia is the braver of the girls

Superlative adjectives are most frequently used absolutely, but they can also be used with the genitive  "of all":
 : Cornelia is a very brave girl
 : Cornelia is the bravest girl of all.

Detailed information and declension tables can be found at Latin declension.

Pronouns
Pronouns are of two kinds, personal pronouns and 3rd person pronouns. Personal pronouns decline as follows.

 can also be used reflexively ("I see myself" etc.).

 is frequently used in classical Latin for "I", but  is never used in a singular sense.

The genitive  is used partitively ( "each one of us"),  objectively ( "remembering us, mindful of us").

3rd person pronouns are those such as  "this" and  "(he) himself". The 3rd person pronouns can also be used adjectivally (except that  "what?" when adjectival becomes ). The declension of these pronouns tends to be irregular. They generally have -īus in the genitive singular, and -ī in the dative singular. In a few pronouns ( "that",  "that (of yours)",  "it, that",  "which",  "anything; what?",  "another",  "something") the neuter singular ends in -d.

The declension of  "that" is as follows:

 "he himself" is very similar, except that the neuter singular  ends in -m instead of -d.

Other very common 3rd person pronouns are  "this" and  "he, she, it; that". Like other 3rd person pronouns, these can be used either independently ( "he") or adjectivally ( "that man"):

Also very common is the relative pronoun  "who, which". The interrogative  "who? what?" and indefinite  "anyone, anything" are similar apart from the nominative singular:

Like adjectives, pronouns must agree in gender, case, and number with the nouns they refer to, as in the following, where hic is masculine agreeing with amor, but haec is feminine, agreeing with patria:
 = this is my love, this my country

There is no indefinite article or definite article (the, a, an). Sometimes the weak determiner  (English "that, this") can serve for the definite article:

"He persuaded the people that a fleet should be built with the money (with that money)"

Adverbs
Adverbs modify verbs, adjectives and other adverbs by indicating time, place or manner. Latin adverbs are indeclinable and invariable. Like adjectives, adverbs have positive, comparative and superlative forms.

The positive form of an adverb can often be formed from an adjective by appending the suffix -ē (2nd declension adjectives) or -(t)er (3rd declension adjectives). Thus the adjective , which means "bright", can be contrasted to the adverb , which means "brightly". The adverbial ending  is used to form adverbs from 3rd declension adjectives, for example  "quick",  "quickly". Other endings such as -ō, -e, -tim are also found.

The comparative form of an adverb is the same as the neuter nominative singular form of a comparative adjective and usually ends in -ius.

The superlative adverb has the same base as the superlative adjective and always ends in a long -ē.

Prepositions

Prepositions
A prepositional phrase in Latin is made up of a preposition followed by a noun phrase in the accusative or ablative case. The preposition determines the case that is used, with some prepositions allowing different cases depending on the meaning. For example, Latin in takes the accusative case when it indicates motion (English "into") and the ablative case when it indicates position (English "on" or "inside"):
 = "into the city" (accusative)
 = "in the city" (ablative)

Most prepositions take one case only. For example, all those that mean "from", "by", or "with" take the ablative:
 = "out of the city"
 = "(away) from the city"
 = "with Caesar"

Other prepositions take only the accusative:
 = "outside the city"
 = "to/near the city"
 = "through(out) the city"
 = "around the city"

Postpositions
In addition, there are a few postpositions.  "as far as" usually follows an ablative, sometimes a genitive plural case:
 "as far as Taurus"
 "as far as Cumae"

 "towards the Alps"

 "for the sake of" follows a genitive:
 "for the sake of (doing) honour"

The word  "with" is usually a preposition, but with the personal pronouns  "me, you sg., him/herself/themselves, us, you pl." it follows the pronoun and is joined to it in writing:
 "with him"
 "with me"

Both  and  "with whom" are found.

Numerals and numbers

The first three numbers have masculine, feminine and neuter forms fully declined as follows:

 (one) can also be used in the plural, with plural-only nouns, e.g.  "one camp",  "one letter". For larger numbers plural-only nouns use special numerals:  "two camps",  "three camps". (See Latin numerals.)

The numbers  (four) through  (ten) are not declined:
 (4)
 (5)
 (6)
 (7)
 (8)
 (9)
 (10)

The "tens" numbers are also not declined:
 (20)
 (30)
 (40)
 (50)
 (60)
 (70)
 (80)
 (90)

The numbers 11 to 17 are formed by affixation of the corresponding digit to the base , hence .

Compounds ending in 1 2 and 3 are the only ones to decline:
I saw 20 blackbirds = 
I saw 22 blackbirds =  (where  changes to agree with )

The "hundreds" numbers are the following:
 (indeclinable)
  (200)
  (300)
  (400)
  (500)
  (600)
  (700)
  (800)
  (900)

I saw a thousand lions = 
I saw three thousand lions = 

Ordinal numbers are all adjectives with regular first- and second-declension endings.

Verbs

Persons of the verb
Each tense has endings corresponding to three persons in the singular, known as 1st person singular ("I"), 2nd person singular ("you sg."), 3rd person singular ("he, she, it"), and three in the plural, known as 1st person plural ("we"), 2nd person plural ("you pl."), and 3rd person plural ("they"). Unlike Ancient Greek, there is no dual number in the Latin verb.

Unlike in Spanish, French, and other Romance languages, there are no respectful 2nd person forms in Latin grammar: the 2nd person singular is used even when addressing a person of high status. However, the 1st person plural is often used to mean "I".

Gender
Most verbs do not show grammatical gender: the same ending is used whether the subject is "he", "she", or "it". However, when a verb is made periphrastically out of a participle and part of the verb  "I am", the participle shows gender, for example:
 "he was sent"
 "she was sent"

Impersonal verbs, such as  "it was reported", are neuter singular.

Voice
Latin verbs have two voices, active (e.g.  "I lead") and passive (e.g.  "I am led").

In addition there are a few verbs (e.g.  "I follow") which have the endings of passive verbs but with an active meaning, a relic of the older mediopassive voice. These verbs are known as deponent verbs.
Intransitive verbs such as  "I am" usually have no passive voice. However, some intransitive verbs can be used in the passive voice, but only when impersonal, e.g.  "(a battle) was fought",  "they came" (literally, "it was come").

Mood
Latin verbs have three moods: indicative, subjunctive, and imperative:

Ordinary statements such as  "I lead" or  "he came" are said to be in the indicative mood. The subjunctive mood (e.g.  "he may lead, he would lead" or  "he would have led") is used for potential or hypothetical statements, wishes, and also in reported speech and certain types of subordinate clause. The imperative mood (e.g.  "lead!") is a command.

In addition Latin verbs have a number of non-finite forms, such as the infinitive and various participles.

Regular and irregular verbs

Most Latin verbs are regular and follow one of the five patterns below. (Verbs like  are regarded as variations of the 3rd conjugation, with some forms like those of the 4th conjugation.)

Other verbs like  "I am" are irregular and have their own pattern.

Compound verbs such as  "I am present",  "I don't want",  "I go back", etc., usually have the same endings as the simple verbs from which they are made.

Tenses

A 3rd conjugation example
Latin verbs have six basic tenses in the indicative mood. Three of these are based on the present stem (e.g. dūc-) and three on the perfect stem (e.g. dūx-).

In addition, there are four tenses in the subjunctive mood, and two in the imperative.

Further tenses can be made periphrastically by combining participles with the verbs  "I am" or  "I have", for example  "I was going to lead" or  "I have led".

The following table gives the various forms of a 3rd conjugation verb . The perfect and supine stems for any particular verb cannot always be predicted and usually have to be looked up in a dictionary.

A distinction between perfective aspect (I did) and imperfective aspect (I was doing) is found only in the past in Latin. In the present or future, the same tenses have both aspectual meanings.

Unlike in Ancient Greek or modern English, there is no distinction between perfect (I have done) and simple past (I did). The same tense, known in Latin grammar as the perfect tense, has both meanings.

The passive imperative is almost never used except in deponent verbs, e.g.  "follow me!"

Variations
The different conjugations differ in some tenses. For example, in the future tense:
1st and 2nd conjugation verbs and  have the endings  (e.g.  "I will love",  "I will see",  "I will go"). 
 and  have the endings  ( "I will be",  "I will be able")

In the imperfect indicative:
Most verbs have the endings  (e.g. )
 and  have  (e.g.  "I was able")

They also differ in the present subjunctive:
1st conjugation verbs have the endings  (e.g.  "I may love")
2nd, 3rd, 4th conjugations have  ( "I may see",  "I may lead",  "I may hear",  "I may go")

The imperfect subjunctive of every verb looks like the infinitive + an ending:
Regular: 
Irregular: 

In the various perfect tenses, all verbs have regular endings. However, the stem to which the perfect endings are added cannot always be guessed, and so is given in dictionaries.

Word order

Latin allows a very flexible word order because of its inflectional syntax. Ordinary prose tended to follow the pattern of subject, direct object, indirect object, adverbial words or phrases, verb (with the proviso that when noun and verb make a compound, as  "I attack / make an attack" the noun is generally placed close to the verb). Any extra but subordinate verb, such as an infinitive, is placed before the main verb. Adjectives and participles usually directly follow nouns unless they are adjectives of beauty, size, quantity, goodness, or truth, in which case they usually precede the noun being modified. However, departures from these rules are frequent.

Relative clauses are commonly placed after the antecedent that the relative pronoun describes. Since grammatical function in a sentence is based not on word order but on inflection, the usual word order in Latin was often abandoned with no detriment to understanding but with various changes in emphasis.

While these patterns of word order were the most frequent in Classical Latin prose, they were frequently varied. The strongest surviving evidence suggests that the word order of colloquial Latin was mostly Subject-Object-Verb. That can be found in some very conservative Romance languages, such as Sardinian and Sicilian in which the verb is still often placed at the end of the sentence (see Vulgar Latin). On the other hand, subject-verb-object word order was probably also common in ancient Latin conversation, as it is prominent in the Romance languages, which evolved from Latin.

In poetry, however, word order was often changed for the sake of the meter for which vowel quantity (short vowels vs. long vowels and diphthongs) and consonant clusters, not rhyme and word stress, governed the patterns. One must bear in mind that poets in the Roman world wrote primarily for the ear, not the eye; many premiered their work in recitation for an audience. Hence, variations in word order served a rhetorical as well as a metrical purpose; they certainly did not prevent understanding.

In Virgil's Eclogues, for example, he writes, : "Love conquers all, let us too yield to love!".

The ending of the common Roman name Mārcus is different in each of the following pairs of examples because of its grammatical usage in each pair. The ordering in the second sentence of each pair would be correct in Latin and clearly understood, whereas in English it is awkward, at best, and meaningless, at worst:

: Marcus hits Cornelia. (subject–verb–object)
: Marcus Cornelia hits. (subject–object–verb)
: Cornelia gave Marcus a gift. (subject–verb–indirect object–direct object)
: Cornelia (to) Marcus a gift gave. (subject–indirect object–direct object–verb)

See also
 Declension of Greek nouns in Latin
 Latin syntax
 Latin mnemonics
 Latin word order
 Latin numerals

Bibliography

References

External links
 New Latin Grammar by Charles E. Bennett (free ebook) (1895, 3rd edition 1918)
 Allen and Greenough's New Latin Grammar for Schools and Colleges (1903) (public domain book)
 "Textkit.com" Website containing links to useful resources for learners of Latin.
 Ablative Absolute from Allen and Greenough's New Latin Grammar
 Ablative Absolute by William Harris
 A Practical Grammar of the Latin Language; with Perpetual Exercises in Speaking and Writing: For the Use of Schools, Colleges, and Private Learners, by George J. Adler
 Corpus Grammaticorum Latinorum: complete texts and full bibliography

 

fr:Latin#Grammaire